Hoplocorypha perplexa is a species of praying mantis found in Angola, Namibia, Tanzania, Zimbabwe and the Congo River area.

See also
List of mantis genera and species

References

Hoplocorypha
Mantodea of Africa
Insects described in 1912